The 2008 season was the 96th year of competitive soccer in the United States.

National team

Men

Senior

The home team or the team that is designated as the home team is listed in the left column; the away team is in the right column.

Women

Senior

The United States Women's National Soccer Team was coached by Pia Sundhage.

Four Nations Tournament

Algarve Cup

2008 Olympic Qualifying

International Friendlies

Peace Queen Cup

International Friendlies

2008 Beijing Olympics

International Friendlies

Major League Soccer

Table

Playoffs

1 The New York Red Bulls earned the eighth and final playoff berth, despite finishing fifth in the Eastern Conference. They represent the fourth seed in the Western Conference playoff bracket, as only three teams in the Western Conference qualified for the playoffs.

MLS Cup

USL First Division

Table

Tie-breaker order: 1. Head-to-head points; 2. Total wins; 3. Goal difference; 4. Goals for; 5. Lottery
† Rochester deducted 1 point for use of an ineligible player on August 10, 2008

Playoffs
Teams will be re-seeded for semifinal matchups

Final

USL Second Division

Table

† Western Mass and Real Maryland deducted 1 point

Playoffs

Final

Lamar Hunt U.S. Open Cup

Final

American clubs in international competitions

Houston Dynamo

New England Revolution

D.C. United

Chivas USA

Los Angeles Galaxy

References
 American competitions at RSSSF
 American national team matches at RSSSF

 
2008